Paruchuri Ashok Babu is the former  President of the APNGO (Andhra Pradesh non-gazetted officers') association, and is at the forefront of the agitation for Samaikyandhra (United Andhra Pradesh).

Ashok Babu Team won the APNGO elections on 5 January 2014 with sweeping majority. In 2019 February, Elected as MLC from TDP Party.

References

Living people
Andhra Pradesh local politicians
Place of birth missing (living people)
1959 births